Robert Ritchie may refer to:
Robert Ritchie (racing driver) (fl. 1955), Hong Kong racecar driver
Bob Ritchie (ice hockey) (born 1955), Canadian former ice hockey left winger
Robert J. Ritchie (politician) (fl. 1878–1890), lawyer and politician in New Brunswick, Canada
Robert J. Ritchie (railroad executive) (1990–2012), former president and CEO of the Canadian Pacific Railway
Robert Ritchie (Australian politician) (1836–1891), New South Wales politician
Robert O. Ritchie (fl. 2013–2017), professor of engineering
Robert T. Ritchie, priest and rector of St. Patrick's Cathedral, New York City
Robert Yarnall Richie (1908–1984), American photographer
Robert Ritchie (footballer) (1884–1954), Australian rules footballer
Robert Peel Ritchie (1835–1902), Scottish physician and medical historian
Robert Ritchie (The West Wing), a fictional character on the American TV drama The West Wing
Robert Ritchie, American rapper, known as Kid Rock
Robert Ritchie, mayor of Strathcona and name sake of Ritchie, Edmonton
Robert Ritchie (priest), American Anglo-Catholic clergyman and author

See also
Rob Richie (born 1962), American electoral reform advocate
Robert Richie (Venice), 18th century diplomat, see List of diplomats from the United Kingdom to the Republic of Venice